Rammurti  Singh Verma (29 July 1950 – 23 April 2021) was an Indian politician and  a member of the Sixteenth Legislative Assembly of Uttar Pradesh in  India. He represented the Dadraul constituency of Uttar Pradesh and was a  member of the Samajwadi Party political party. He died in April 2021 aged 70.

Early life and education
Rammurti Singh Verma was born in Shahjahanpur district. He attended the Sampurnanand Sanskrit University and attained Bachelor of Art  degree. He Had Two Son's Elder Died In A Car Accident & Younger Son "Rajesh Verma" Is also a politician in Shahjahanpur, Uttar Pradesh

Political career
Rammurti Singh Verma was a four time MLA -- three times from Jalalabad seat and once from Dadraul. He also represented Shahjahanpur in Lok Sabha and was a member of the Samajwadi Party political party. 

He lost his seat in the 2017 Uttar Pradesh Assembly election to Manvendra Singh of the Bharatiya Janata Party.

Controversy

There was a probe against state minister Rammurti Singh Verma for the murder of journalist Jagendra Singh, who was allegedly set afire by the minister and five others on 1 June after which he died on 8 June during treatment. An FIR was registered against minister for Backward Classes Welfare Ram Murti Verma, Inspector (Chowk) Sri Prakash Rai, Gufran, Akash Gupta, Amit Pratap Singh and Bhure for killing Jagendra by setting him afire.
The FIR was registered at Puwayan police station of Shahjahanpur by victim's son Raghvendra after his father died during treatment at a hospital.

Posts held

See also
 Dadraul (Assembly constituency)
 Sixteenth Legislative Assembly of Uttar Pradesh
 Uttar Pradesh Legislative Assembly
Kanth

References 

Samajwadi Party politicians
Uttar Pradesh MLAs 2012–2017
People from Shahjahanpur district
Sampurnanand Sanskrit Vishwavidyalaya alumni
1950 births
2021 deaths